Paul Anthony Christopher (born 19 June 1954) is an English former professional footballer who played in the Football League for Mansfield Town.

References

1954 births
Living people
English footballers
Association football forwards
English Football League players
AFC Bournemouth players
Mansfield Town F.C. players
Salisbury City F.C. players
Poole Town F.C. players